Žvejybos uostas (lit. Fishing Port) is a neighbourhood in southern Klaipėda, the capital of Klaipėda County, Lithuania. It shares borders with Gandrališkės, Dubysos, Baltijos, Poilsis to the east and Smeltė to the south.

References

Neighbourhoods of Klaipėda